The territorial government of the United States Virgin Islands has for operational purposes established two districts, which include the minor islets nearest to the major islands:
 Saint Croix
 Saint Thomas and Saint John

The U.S. Virgin Islands legislature has 15 seats: 7 seats are for the Saint Croix District, 7 seats are for the Saint Thomas and Saint John District, and one seat is for someone who must live in Saint John.

The U.S. Virgin Islands have no municipalities; the only government is for the territory as a whole.

The territory has historically been divided into quarters (which are not one-fourth of anything) and 
estates. These were used for census purposes until 1980, and estates are commonly used for navigation, writing addresses, and discussing real estate. The U.S. Census uses three districts (Saint Thomas, Saint John, and Saint Croix) as county equivalents.

In more recent census decades, quarters and estates have been replaced by 20 census subdistricts, which were defined by the territorial government as more meaningful given the terrain and current population distribution. These are used as minor civil divisions.

See also
List of settlements in the United States Virgin Islands
Islands of U.S. Virgin Islands
Minor islands of the United States Virgin Islands

References

External links 
Districts of the United States Virgin Islands, United States Census Bureau
Quarters and estates of Saint Croix
Quarters and estates of Saint John

Geography of the United States Virgin Islands
United States Virgin Islands, Districts and sub-districts
United States Virgin Islands
 
United States Virgin Islands
United States Virgin Islands geography-related lists